Dundee International Sports Center (DISC) is a sports centre in Dundee, Scotland, opened in the late 1990s. In 1998, DISC staged the European Hockey Championships. In April 2015 it hosted a Celtic Cup match between Scotland and Ireland. It was the first international wheelchair rugby league match to be played in Scotland.

Present day 

The sports centre is used as a physical education base for Morgan Academy and its pupils.  Morgan Academy is one of a few in Scotland that use facilities like this.
Most facilities are accessible by wheelchair.

References

External links 
 Dundee International Sports Centre Official Website.

Field hockey venues in Scotland
Sports venues in Dundee